Suture Bench is a bench-like elevation at the southeast end of Gair Mesa that overlooks the head of Campbell Glacier, in Victoria Land. Named by the northern party of New Zealand Geological Survey Antarctic Expedition (NZGSAE), 1962–63, because of a dog fight here in which one dog was so badly torn that its wounds required sutures.

References

Terraces of Antarctica
Landforms of Victoria Land
Scott Coast